Martinez (Spanish: Martínez) is a populated place on the lands of the Torres-Martinez Desert Cahuilla Indians in Riverside County, California.

History
Martinez was formerly the site of the headquarters of the Torres Martinez Indian Reservation and the earlier historical headquarters of the 19th century Martinez Indian Agency for the Desert Cahuilla. It was first, from 1862, a water stop and later a stage station on the Bradshaw Trail between San Bernardino and La Paz, Arizona.

References

Unincorporated communities in Riverside County, California
Bradshaw Trail